My Teen Romantic Comedy SNAFU Climax is a 2020 comedy, slice of life Japanese anime based on My Youth Romantic Comedy Is Wrong, as I Expected, the light novels written by Wataru Watari. It is the third and final season of the series, which began airing in 2013 with a second season in 2015. After realizing the perceived superficiality of their club and relationships, Hachiman Hikigaya, Yukino Yukinoshita, and Yui Yuigahama confront their genuine thoughts and feelings about their situation - and each other - while organizing a variety of social events as they finish their second year at Soubu High School.

The season is produced by Studio feel. and directed by Kei Oikawa, with series composition by Keiichirō Ōchi (replacing Shōtarō Suga, who died in 2015), character designs by Yuichi Tanaka, music by Monaca, and sound direction by Satoshi Motoyama. The season was originally going to premiere on April 9, 2020 on TBS with later airings on MBS, CBC, and BS-TBS and streaming on Amazon Prime Video, before being delayed to July 2020 due to the COVID-19 pandemic. The anime's production used a "trial and error" process that accounts for the safety of the production staff.  The third season aired from July 9 to September 24, 2020. Sentai Filmworks has licensed the season globally excluding Asia. In Southeast Asia, the season is licensed by Medialink and released on streaming service iQIYI.  The season ran for 12 episodes.

The season uses six pieces of theme music: one opening theme, three ending themes and two insert songs. The main opening theme is "Megumi no ame" (芽ぐみの雨, Sprout rain) by Nagi Yanagi. The main ending theme is "Diamond no jundo" (ダイヤモンドの純度, Diamond clarity) by Yukino Yukinoshita (Saori Hayami) and Yui Yuigahama (Nao Tōyama). Two additional variations on this ending theme will be used: Diamond no jundo -Ballade Arrange-Yui Solo Ver. (ダイヤモンドの純度 ~Yui Ballade~) by Yui Yuigahama (Tōyama) as the ending theme of the fourth episode and Diamond no jundo -Ballade Arrange-Yukino Solo Ver. (ダイヤモンドの純度 ~Yukino Ballade~) by Yukino Yukinoshita (Hayami) as the ending theme of the eleventh episode. As in Season 2, "Bitter Bitter Sweet" is used as the insert song for the first episode and also performed by Hayami and Tōyama as their respective characters. "Yukitoki" (ユキトキ) by Yanagi is used again as the insert song for the final credits of the twelfth episode.



Episode list

Home media 
Marvelous! released the season in Japan on six Blu-ray and DVD volumes between September 25, 2020 and March 26, 2021. Limited Edition Blu-ray volumes included bonus light novels of the series.

Notes

References

External links 

 Official anime website (in Japanese)
 My Teen Romantic Comedy SNAFU Climax (anime) at Anime News Network's encyclopedia

My Teen Romantic Comedy SNAFU episode lists
2020 Japanese television seasons
Anime postponed due to the COVID-19 pandemic